Nicholas Benois (13 July 1813 – 23 December 1898) was an Imperial Russian architect who worked in Peterhof and other suburbs of St Petersburg.

Biography
Benois was born in Russia, to Anna Katarina (Groppe), who was of German descent, and a French father, Louis Jules Benois (from Brie, Saint-Ouen-sur-Morin). He studied at the Imperial Academy of Arts from 1827 to 1836. Eight years later, he was appointed a court architect to Nicholas I of Russia and oversaw several projects in the town of Peterhof, notably the Principal Imperial Stables (1847–52). He was quite notable in 19th-century Russia for adhering to the Gothic Revival style of architecture and decoration.

Benois designed some of the first railway stations in Russia, notably in Strelna, Tsarskoe Selo and New Peterhof, the last being considered his masterpiece. Later in his career he also worked in the Caucasus, where he designed the Summer Palace of the Viceroy in Likani, Georgia.

By his marriage to Camilla, daughter of Alberto Cavos who designed Mariinsky Theatre, Nicholas had four sons. Of these, Alexander Benois specialized in stage design, Albert Benois was a painter, and Leon Benois became a distinguished architect. His daughter married the sculptor Eugeny Alexandrovich Lanceray, and that marriage produced the artists Zinaida Serebriakova and Eugene Lanceray. The actor Peter Ustinov was a great-grandson.

Selected works

References

External links
 Nicholas Benois in Peterhof 

1813 births
1898 deaths
Architects from Saint Petersburg
People from Sankt-Peterburgsky Uyezd
Nicholas
People from the Russian Empire of French descent
19th-century architects from the Russian Empire